Bharuch is one of the 182 Legislative Assembly constituencies of Gujarat state in India. It is part of Bharuch district.

List of segments
This assembly seat represents the following segments,

 Bharuch Taluka (Part) Villages – Kanthariya, Sherpura, Umraj, Chavaj, Vadadla, Haldarwa, Jhadeshwar, Bholav, Nandelav, Rahadpor, Borbhatha Bet, Bharuch INA, Bharuch (M), Maktampur (CT)
 Ankleshwar Taluka (Part) Villages – Chhapra, Kansiya, Mandvabuzarg, Naugama, Samor, Motali, Amrutpura, Uchhali, Kararvel, Dadhal, Sarangpore, Jitali, Piprod, Avadar, Pardi Mokha, Sangpor, Andada (CT)

Members of Legislative Assembly
1995 - Bipinbhai Shah, Bharatiya Janata Party
1998 - Bipinbhai Shah, Bharatiya Janata Party
2002 - Rameshbhai Mistry, Bharatiya Janata Party
2007 - Dushyantbhai Patel, Bharatiya Janata Party
2012 - Dushyantbhai Patel, Bharatiya Janata Party

Election results

2022

2017

2012

See also
 List of constituencies of the Gujarat Legislative Assembly
 Bharuch district

References

External links
 

Assembly constituencies of Gujarat
Bharuch